Arona is a borough in Westmoreland County, Pennsylvania, United States. The population was 253 at the 2020 census.

Geography
Arona is located at  (40.269740, -79.660429).

Demographics

At the 2010 census there were 370 people, 153 households, and 108 families in the borough. The population density was 664.8 people per square mile (256.5/km²). There were 165 housing units at an average density of 311.3 per square mile (120.2/km²). The racial makeup of the borough was 100.0% White.
Of the 153 households 25.5% had children under the age of 18 living with them, 54.2% were married couples living together, 10.5% had a female householder with no husband present, and 29.4% were non-families. 24.8% of households were one person and 11.8% were one person aged 65 or older. The average household size was 2.42 and the average family size was 2.85.

The age distribution was 21.1% under the age of 18, 6.0% from 18 to 24, 26.5% from 25 to 44, 31.4% from 45 to 64, and 14.7% 65 or older. The median age was 42.4 years. For every 100 females, there were 97.9 males. For every 100 females age 18 and over, there were 100.0 males.

The median household income was $40,417 and the median family income  was $61,875. Males had a median income of $38,876 versus $23,185 for females. The per capita income for the borough was $18,494. About 4.4% of families and 8.6% of the population were below the poverty line, including 7.1% of those under age 18 and 8.7% of those age 65 or over.

References

Boroughs in Westmoreland County, Pennsylvania
Populated places established in 1895
Pittsburgh metropolitan area
1895 establishments in Pennsylvania